Syzygium micranthum is a species of plant in the family Myrtaceae. It is endemic to Sri Lanka.

References

Flora of Sri Lanka
micranthum
Vulnerable plants
Taxonomy articles created by Polbot